Alfredo Galicia Marañon Jr. (21 December 1935 – 1 October 2020) was a Filipino politician from Sagay City who served as Governor of Negros Occidental.

Personal life
Marañon, also known as "Freddie" by his peers, was the third child of the late Alfredo Espinosa Marañon Sr. of Mandurriao, Iloilo and the late Salvacion Galicia Marañon of Sagay City. He was the brother of former Governor Joseph G. Maranon. His wife is Marilyn Andres Dalisay-Marañon of Looc, Romblon. His son is politician Alfredo "Thirdy" D. Marañon III. He was a farmer, civil engineer and aquaculturist by profession.

Marañon attained his Bachelor of Science in Civil Engineering degree at De La Salle University, Manila. He attended the University of Negros Occidental-Recoletos in Bacolod and Sagay Elementary School for his secondary and elementary education.

Marañon died of cardiac health problems in a hospital in Bacolod on October 1, 2020, aged 84.

Political career
Marañon started his political career in 1964, when he became municipal councillor in Sagay. He later served as vice mayor and eventually mayor of Sagay, a post held previously by his older brother, the late Gov. Joseph G. Marañon. He assumed office as Governor of Negros Occidental on June 30, 2010, implementing the Negros First! strategic development plan for the province. Negros First! seeks to optimize the potentials of Negros Occidental as an agricultural province to ensure food sufficiency and agricultural productivity as well as generate livelihood for the poor and marginalized. His term in office ended in 2019.

References

External links

Province of Negros Occidental Official website

|-

Governors of Negros Occidental
1935 births
2020 deaths
Mayors of places in Negros Occidental
De La Salle University alumni
Nationalist People's Coalition politicians
Filipino Roman Catholics
Visayan people